Too Late to Say Goodbye is a 2009 American-Canadian television film directed by Norma Bailey and starring Rob Lowe and Lauren Holly.  It is based on the 2007 true crime book of the same name by Ann Rule.

After Bart Corbin's (Rob Lowe) wife Jenn dies in their home, Heather (Lauren Holly), Jenn's sister, starts a relentless campaign to make the police believe Bart murdered her.

Cast
Rob Lowe as Bart Corbin
Lauren Holly as Heather
Michelle Hurd as Det. Anne Roche
Stefanie von Pfetten as Jenn Corbin
Marc Bendavid as Sam Malveau
Rosemary Dunsmore as Narda Barber
Art Hindle as Max Barber
Yannick Bisson as Bobby Corbin

Production
The film was shot in Ontario.

Reception
Sloan Freer of Radio Times awarded the film two stars out of five.

References

External links
 
 
 

English-language Canadian films
2009 television films
Lifetime (TV network) films
Television shows based on American novels
Canadian television films
Films shot in Ontario
2009 films
2000s Canadian films